Iporã is a municipality in the northwest of the state of Paraná, approximately sixty kilometers from the border with Paraguay. Its population in 2020 was estimated to be 13,782.

References

Municipalities in Paraná